Vernon School District may refer to:
 School District 22 Vernon (British Columbia, Canada)
 Vernon Elementary School District (Arizona, United States)
 Vernon Township School District (New Jersey, United States)